Barfabad may refer to:
 Barfabad-e Olya
 Barfabad-e Sofla